Reiner Torres is a Cuban sprint canoer who has competed since the late 2000s. He won a bronze medal in the K-2 1000 m event at the 2009 ICF Canoe Sprint World Championships in Dartmouth.

References
Canoe09.ca profile

Cuban male canoeists
Living people
Year of birth missing (living people)
ICF Canoe Sprint World Championships medalists in kayak
Canoeists at the 2016 Summer Olympics
Olympic canoeists of Cuba
Pan American Games medalists in canoeing
Pan American Games gold medalists for Cuba
Pan American Games silver medalists for Cuba
Canoeists at the 2015 Pan American Games
Medalists at the 2011 Pan American Games
Medalists at the 2015 Pan American Games
21st-century Cuban people